End of the Road is a 1970 American comedy drama film directed, co-written, and edited by Aram Avakian and adapted from a 1958 novel by John Barth, and stars Stacy Keach, James Earl Jones and Harris Yulin.

The film was given an X rating for an abortion scene, and other frank scenes including one in which a naked man rapes a chicken. The film won the Golden Leopard at the Locarno International Film Festival.

A nine-page Life Magazine article was published on Aram Avakian and End of the Road on November 7, 1969. Avakian was also interviewed at length in Playboy and Esquire. End of the Road is a ground-breaking early indie picture. Many of the cast and crew went on to distinguished careers.

The film gained a cult following at art movie houses across the U.S., where audiences would speak aloud the lines while they watched the midnight screenings. In 2012 it was released again (DVD) from a brand new original print struck from a pristine negative by Warner Brothers, as part of a series of re-discovered cinematic treasures in their archives. The director Steven Soderbergh rediscovered the film, spearheaded its revival, and made a companion documentary, An Amazing Time: A Conversation About End of the Road.

Plot

After a catatonic episode on a railway station platform, Jacob Horner is taken to "The Farm", a bizarre insane asylum run by Doctor D. After being cured, Jacob takes a job as an English lecturer and begins a disastrous affair with Rennie, the wife of a colleague.

Cast
Stacy Keach as Jacob Horner
Harris Yulin as Joe Morgan
Dorothy Tristan as Rennie Morgan
James Earl Jones as Doctor D
Grayson Hall as Peggy Rankin
Ray Brock as Nurse Dockey and the Sniper
John Pleshette as Finkle
James Coco as School Man

Reception

John Simon wrote "End of the Road is a pretentious, unappetizing disaster."

See also
 List of American films of 1970

References

External links

1970 films
Golden Leopard winners
Films with screenplays by Terry Southern
Films directed by Aram Avakian
1970s English-language films
American comedy-drama films
1970s American films